Fatigue is a subjective feeling of tiredness and exhaustion in humans.

Fatigue or fatigues may also refer to:


Medical
Central nervous system fatigue, changes in the synaptic concentration of neurotransmitters which affects exercise performance and muscle function
Synaptic fatigue
Chronic fatigue, long term fatigue that limits a person's energy or ability to carry out daily activities, also known as central fatigue 
Cancer-related fatigue, a side effect of chemotherapy, radiation therapy, and biotherapy
Compassion fatigue, a lessening of compassion common among those who work with trauma victims
Muscle fatigue, the decline in ability of a muscle to generate force, also known as peripheral fatigue 
Battle fatigue/Combat fatigue, an outdated term for:
Combat stress reaction, a military term for short-term behavioral disorganization
Post-traumatic stress disorder, a medical term for a long-term disorder
Effects of fatigue on safety in transportation and shift work
Pilot fatigue
Sleep-deprived driving

Other uses
Fatigue (material), the initiation and propagation of cracks in a material due to cyclic loading
Voter fatigue, public apathy about elections
Information fatigue, impairment caused by excessive information
Fatigue (safety), implications of tiredness in many fields, especially transportation
Fatigue Mountain, on the border of Alberta and British Columbia, Canada
Fatigue duty, work assigned to military men that does not require the use of armament.
Fatigues (uniform), a military work uniform
Plain OG-107 uniform in American English
Boilersuits worn by soldiers to avoid getting their uniforms dirty in non-combat manual work
Camouflage pattern on military or fashion clothing
Fatigues, a more general term for workwear
"The Fatigues", a Seinfeld episode

See also
Metal Fatigue (disambiguation)